"Let's Get Married" is a song by American contemporary R&B group Jagged Edge from their second studio album, J.E. Heartbreak (1999). Released on April 11, 2000, the song spent three weeks atop the US Billboard Hot R&B/Hip-Hop Singles & Tracks chart in 2000 and reached number 11 on the Billboard Hot 100. In 2001, the song was issued in Australia as a double A-side with "Promise" and reached number two on the Australian Singles Chart. The music video (directed by Tim Story) features Fredro Starr and Kent Masters-King as the fictional couple deciding on whether they should get married or not.

The song's official remix features DJ Run of Run-D.M.C. and samples the group's debut single "It's Like That". The official video for the remix was directed by Bryan Barber. The group performed the single at the kayfabe wedding of Theodore Long and Kristal Marshall on the September 21, 2007, episode of WWE Friday Night SmackDown. Another "Reception Remix" was produced by Kanye West and samples Hall & Oates' song "Grounds for Separation". West also performs a guest verse on the Reception Remix.

Track listings

US maxi-CD single
 "Let's Get Married" (album version) – 4:23
 "Let's Get Married" (Reception remix) – 3:50
 "Let's Get Married" (Remarqable remix featuring Run) – 4:09
 "Let's Get Married" (Metromix radio remix) – 3:31
 "Let's Get Married" (Metromix club remix) – 7:38
 "Let's Get Married" (Metromix dub) – 7:38

European CD single
 "Let's Get Married" (album version) – 4:23
 "Let's Get Married" (Remarqable remix featuring Run) – 4:09

Australian CD single
 "Let's Get Married" (Remarqable remix featuring Run)
 "Promise" (Cool JD remix featuring Loon)
 "Let's Get Married"
 "Promise"
 "Promise" (Speakeasy extended remix)

Charts

Weekly charts

Year-end-charts

Certifications

References

External links
 "Let's Get Married" (remix) video at YouTube

1999 songs
2000 singles
Columbia Records singles
Jagged Edge (American group) songs
Music videos directed by Tim Story
So So Def Recordings singles
Song recordings produced by Bryan-Michael Cox
Song recordings produced by Jermaine Dupri
Songs about marriage
Songs written by Bryan-Michael Cox
Songs written by Jermaine Dupri